Waves is a 2019 American drama film written, produced and directed by Trey Edward Shults. Along with Shults, it was produced by Kevin Turen and Jessica Row. It stars Kelvin Harrison Jr., Taylor Russell, Lucas Hedges, Alexa Demie, Renée Elise Goldsberry, and Sterling K. Brown. It traces the emotional journey of a suburban American family as they navigate love, forgiveness and coming together in the wake of a tragic loss.

Principal photography began on July 9, 2018 in Broward County, Florida and wrapped up on August 24, 2018. The cast was announced in July, with Demie joining in August.

It had its world premiere at the Telluride Film Festival on August 30, 2019, and was released in the United States on November 15, 2019, by A24. It received positive reviews from critics, who praised the performances (particularly that of Harrison, Russell, and Brown), cinematography, and Shults' direction. It grossed over $2 million worldwide.

Plot 
Tyler Williams is a popular high school senior on the wrestling team. He parties with his friends and spends time with his girlfriend, Alexis Lopez, but is routinely pushed to be better by his domineering father, Ronald. Unbeknownst to anyone, Tyler suffers from a Level 5 SLAP tear, which he keeps secret from his family and team by stealing his father's painkillers. Against the recommendation of his doctor, Tyler continues to wrestle competitively until he is thrown onto his shoulder during a match, causing irreparable damage and ending his season, as well as his career. Tyler's life is further complicated when he receives a text from Alexis, who reveals that her period is late, indicating that she is pregnant. He takes her to get an abortion, but she has a last-minute change of heart. On the way home, the couple has a fight and Alexis walks home alone.

Distraught, Tyler begins drinking heavily and abusing drugs. Eventually, Tyler texts Alexis, who is willing to mend their relationship. She tells Tyler that she has decided to keep the child with support from her family, but when Tyler demands to speak to her in person, Alexis breaks up with him and blocks his number, sending him into a rage as he destroys his bedroom. The night of the school's "Maverick Ball", a grounded Tyler goes on Instagram and sees a picture showing Alexis posing with another boy. He gets drunk and high and attempts to leave the house, but is confronted by his stepmom, Catherine. His father attempts to defuse the situation, but Tyler pushes him to the floor and leaves.

He drives to a house party, where he sees Alexis go upstairs with the boy from the photo. Tyler's younger sister Emily notices his arrival from a distance but says nothing, and Tyler drinks heavily before following Alexis to the garage. An exchange of words leads to an argument, which turns physical when Alexis slaps Tyler and he hits her back, causing her head to hit the floor. She begins to bleed out, and, horrified, Tyler flees. Ronald arrives shortly after, finding Emily, who tearfully confirms Ronald's suspicions. Tyler returns home before attempting to run away on foot. However, he is quickly caught and arrested by the police. Paramedics attempt to resuscitate Alexis, but she dies from her injuries.

Despite a guilty plea, Tyler is sentenced to life in prison for second-degree murder, with the eligibility of parole after thirty years. After school one day, Emily is approached by Luke, an awkward but kindhearted classmate who was also one of Tyler's wrestling teammates. He asks her out to lunch and the two begin dating. Emily begins to open up to Luke, participating in activities outside of school with him, such as swimming with manatees. During this time, Emily also overhears Ronald and Catherine arguing about Tyler, with Ronald blaming Catherine for her lack of presence in his and Emily's lives, and Catherine accusing Ronald of putting too much pressure on Tyler. During a conversation they have while fishing, Emily reveals to Ronald that she feels guilty, believing that she could've stopped Tyler and that she hates him for what he did. Ronald advises her not to hold a grudge against her brother and that no matter what, he loves them both. The two reconcile.

Meanwhile, Emily and Luke become closer, eventually having sex for the first time. Emily learns from Luke that his estranged, abusive father is dying of cancer, and she urges him to make amends with him with the time he has left, as Emily and Tyler's mother died from a drug overdose when they were young. The two drive to Columbia, Missouri, where Luke's father is residing, and upon seeing his son, Luke's father's spirits are lifted, with Luke forgiving his father. He survives longer than expected, but passes away one night, which causes Luke to heavily sob. Emily consoles Luke on the drive home to Miami while Catherine visits Tyler in prison, Alexis' parents grieve, and Ronald reconnects with Catherine. Sometime after arriving home, Emily rides her bike down an empty street and lifts her arms from the handlebars.

Cast

Production 
Kevin Turen and James Wilson served as producers on the film, with A24 producing and distributing 
and with Trey Edward Shults directing, producing, from a screenplay he wrote.

According to Adam White of The Independent, initially the family of the film did not have a racial background specified in the plans.

Demie suggested a scene where Alexis and Emily meet in a restroom, with the scene implying a change of focus from one woman to the other. Lauren McCarthy of Nylon stated that the film had a "collaborative nature" style.

Demie stated that the filming of the initial driving scene made it seem like a film crew was not present. Demie also stated that Alexis, compared to Maddy Perez in Euphoria, another character Demie portrayed, "is much stronger, she’s always fighting back and setting boundaries".

Casting 
In July 2018, it was announced Lucas Hedges, Sterling K. Brown, Kelvin Harrison Jr. and Taylor Russell joined the cast of the film. In August 2018, Alexa Demie joined the cast.

Filming 
Principal photography began on July 9, 2018 in Broward County, Florida and
Key Biscayne, Florida.  Some filming was done in Hollywood, Florida.

Music 
Trent Reznor and Atticus Ross composed the film's score, replacing Shults' frequent collaboration with Brian McOmber. In an interview, Shults stated, "I got one of the coolest e-mails of my life one day that Trent Reznor was a fan and wanted to meet. I got on a plane as soon as I could and went to L.A. and met him and Atticus for lunch. Instantly, the energy was great. They had seen and dug my other movies and just wanted to work together." The score was released on November 26, 2019, on Nine Inch Nails' online store.

The film's soundtrack features a compilation of contemporary rap, R&B, alternative, and experimental pop music from artists including Animal Collective, Tame Impala, Frank Ocean, A$AP Rocky, Kendrick Lamar, The Shoes, H.E.R., Tyler, the Creator, Fuck Buttons, Amy Winehouse, Kanye West, THEY., Kid Cudi, Colin Stetson, SZA, Chance the Rapper, Radiohead, and Alabama Shakes. The full list of songs used in the film was made available on A24's website, in an article where Shults annotates the usage of the songs.

Shults wrote specific music cues into the screenplay such as Lamar's "Backseat Freestyle" and embedded files into the scripts sent to actors so they could listen to the intended songs for each scene. He shot the film having not yet acquired the rights to certain songs and agreed to cut scenes if negotiations failed than reshoot. A letter and rough cut of the film  was sent to Ocean, who cleared his songs for use after watching. Negotiations with West stretched over months before "I Am a God" was approved with a stipulation that a "clean" version would need to be featured due to West moving away from secular music.

Release 
Waves premiered at the Telluride Film Festival on August 30, 2019. It screened at the Toronto International Film Festival on September 10, 2019. It was released on November 15, 2019 in New York City and Los Angeles, expanding to major U.S. cities the week after, with a wide release set for December 6. In September, Focus Features acquired the international distribution rights to the film, excluding Canada, China and Japan.

Reception

Box office 
Waves grossed a total of $1.7 million in the United States. In its limited opening weekend, the film made $134,333 from four theaters, a per-venue average of $33,583. Expanding to 21 theaters the following weekend the film made $168,760, and then $140,995 from 44 theaters in its third.

Critical response 
The site's consensus reads: "An up-close look at one family's emotional ups and downs, Waves captures complicated dynamics with tenderness and grace." On Metacritic, the film has a weighted average score of 80 out of 100, based on 45 critics, indicating "generally favorable reviews".

Shults' direction and the performances of Harrison, Russell and Brown garnered universal acclaim along with the cinematography and music. Paul Whitington of the Irish Independent gave the film five stars. Brian Tallerico, editor of RogerEbert.com, gave it four out of four stars and wrote "This is a deeper and more profound film than your average character drama, a masterpiece that’s hard to walk away from without checking your own grievances and grief."

IndieWire's Eric Kohn gave the film a B+, stating "It’s a definitive statement on the present moment, evoking the sheer horror of every uncertain exchange, and the courage involved in moving ahead regardless of what it means for the future". Justin Chang of the Los Angeles Times called it "deeply rooted in its characters’ consciousness, alert to the feelings of dread, shame, rage and despair that threaten to bring these fast-moving lives to a standstill". It was chosen by the National Board of Review as one of the ten best films of the year.

Sterling K. Brown stated, "I’ve never seen a middle to upper middle class black family dealing with the problems that [the family] has in this movie".

Prince Shakur of Teen Vogue stated that Tyler's story shows the effects of "toxic masculinity". Harrison stated that due to the previously inferior position in society occupied by African-Americans, there is often "a pressure placed on young Black boys to excel".

Accolades

See also 
 List of black films of the 2010s

Notes

References

External links 
 
 
 
 

2019 romantic drama films
2019 films
A24 (company) films
African-American romantic drama films
Films directed by Trey Edward Shults
Films scored by Atticus Ross
Films scored by Trent Reznor
Films set in Florida
Films shot in Florida
2019 independent films
Focus Features films
Films about father–son relationships
2010s English-language films
2010s American films